Jindřich Štreit (born 5 September 1946 in Vsetín) is a Czech photographer and pedagogue known for his documentary photography. He concentrates on documenting the rural life and people of Czech villages. He is considered one of the most important exponents of Czech documentary photography.

Biography 
Štreit began taking photographs in 1964, during his studies at the Pedagogical Faculty of Palacký University in Olomouc. Following his graduation he worked as a teacher in Rýmařov; later he became director of the school in Sovinec and Jiříkov. In addition to his profession, Štreit actively participated in public life. As a local chronicler he documented the everyday events and life of Czech villages under the communist regime. The photography theorist Antonín Dufek identified him as "a continuer of the tradition of old village teachers, propagators of culture and progress".

In the late 1970s, Štreit's approach to photography began to change. He studied at the Institut výtvarné fotografie (Institute of Art Photography) in Brno, led by K. O. Hrubý and Antonín Hinšt. He graduated from the Institute with a cycle of theatrical photography. At the same time he continued expanding his cycle of everyday life of the villages in the foothills of the Jeseníky Mountains. Additionally, he helped organize cultural life in the region; he participated in organizing exhibitions and concerts.

In 1981, during the general elections in the former Czechoslovakia, Štreit documented the official course of the elections. In some of his photographs made during the meetings of the local authorities, the portrait of the President of Czechoslovakia appeared on photographs in very "unlikely and absurd places". A year later, in June 1982, Štreit agreed to display his works at the exhibition Setkání (The Meeting) organized in Prague by the graphic artist Alena Kučerová. After several hours, the exhibition was banned by the state police and Štreit was arrested and accused of defamation of the President and the country. He was sentenced to ten months' imprisonment with a suspended sentence of two years. As a consequence, he lost his job and was forced to earn a living at a state farm in Rýžoviště. He was banned from taking photographs, but he never respected the ban and returned to photography immediately after his release from the prison. The photography theorist Anna Fárová managed to include his works in the exhibition 9 + 9, visited by Henri Cartier-Bresson, who documented Štreit's installation and published his photos in the French newspaper Le Monde.

In 1989, after the Velvet Revolution and subsequent democratization of Czech society, Štreit was rehabilitated and allowed to take photographs without limitations. In 2009, he was named Professor of Applied Arts by the President of the Czech Republic Václav Klaus. As of 2010, Štreit works as a teacher at the Institut tvůrčí fotografie (Institute of Creative Photography of Silesian University in Opava).

Selected exhibitions 

1990
Sovinec. Side Gallery, Newcastle

2002
Lidé z kraje písku. City Gallery, Pécs; Muvészetek Háza, Eger (both Hungary)
 Katholische Akademie, Munich (together with Adriena Šimotová)
Vesnice je svět. Prospekto Fotografijos Galerija, Vilnius; Fujifilm Fotografijos Galerija, Kaunas (both Lithuania)
Jindřich Štreit: Dans le cadre de Bohemia Magica, Le Château d'Eau, Toulouse
Mezi námi. Cesty života. Brána naděje, Prague
Fotografie. Gallery Langův dům, Frýdek-Místek (Czech Republic)
Za oponou. National Museum, Prague
Fotografie z kraje písku. New Town Hall, Prague
Jindřich Štreit-Tvorivé dielne na Slovensku. Czech Centre, Bratislava

2003
Cesta ke svobodě. Theatre Ludus, Bratislava
Cesta ke svobodě. Czabai IFIHAZ, Békéscsaba (Hungary)
Cesta ke svobodě. Theatre Baj Pomorski, Toruń (Poland)
Lidé olomouckého okresu. Kulturplatz, Münsingen (Switzerland)
Daleko od domova. Czech Centre, Novorosijsk, Moscow
Beziehungen. Fotogalerie Friedrichshain, Berlin
Das Tschechische Dorf. Tschechisches Zentrum / Czechpoint, Berlin
Interpretace. Gallery Caesar, Olomouc (Czech Republic)
Úcta k životu. Church of St. Cyril and Methodius, Přerov (Czech Republic)
Svět dětí. Gallery Auritius, Tábor (Czech Republic)
Cesty života. Gallery Perseus, Olomouc
Viděno srdcem. Olomouc
Lidé mého kraje. Museum in Bruntál, Bruntál

2004
Lidé z kraje písku. Hungarian Cultural Centre, Helsinki
Vztahy. Czech Centre, Dresden; Palais für aktuelle Kunst, Glückstadt (Germany); Neumünster (Germany)
Lidé ledkových dolů. Maison de l'Alsace, Paris
The Village is a Global World. Side Gallery, Newcastle
Mezi námi. Gallery Měsíc ve dne, České Budějovice (Czech Republic)
Život na zámku. Gallery Patro, Olomouc (Czech Republic)
Tak blízko, tak daleko. M.E.C.C.A., Terezín (Czech Republic)
Tak blízko, tak daleko. Theatre, Karlovy Vary (Czech Republic)
Tváře za zdí. Gallery of Critics, Prague
Lidé mého kraje. Gallery Fiducia, Ostrava; Prague

2005
Jindřich Štreit.  Blue Sky Gallery, Portland
Ein tschechisches Universum, Gallery Fotoforum, Innsbruck
Čzech Universum. Photogallery, Bolzano (Italy)
Jindřich Štreit. Photo-Forum, Bozano
Jindřich Štreit. Gallery of the Parliament of Lithuania, Vilnius
So near and yet so far: Photographs from Chechnya and Ingushia. Gallery Vapriikki, Tampere (Finland)
Tak blízko, tak daleko. Museum Kampa, Prague
Vztahy. Gallery 4, Cheb (Czech Republic)
Cesta k člověku. Minorites Monastery, Opava (Czech Republic)
Fotografie J. Štreita ze sbírky Moravské galerie. Moravian Gallery, Brno

2006
Vztahy. Gallery ZPAP Pryzmat, Kraków
Jindřich Štreit. Galeria BWA, Bielsko-Biała (Poland)
Sovinec. Centrum Kultury Zamek, Galeria Fotografii PF, Poznań
Jindřich Štreit. European Parliament, Brussels
Jindřich Štreit. Slovak National Gallery, Bratislava
Jindřich Štreit. House of Arts, Ostrava (Czech Republic)
Jindřich Štreit: Fotografie, které mám rád. Museum of Ostrava, Ostrava
Jindřich Štreit. Orlická galerie, Rychnov nad Kněžnou (Czech Republic)
Vzpomínky. Malá galerie, Kladno (Czech Republic)
Jindřich Štreit. Castle, Sovinec (Czech Republic)
Jindřich Štreit. Gallery Zdeněk Sklenář, Prague

2008
Das Dorf ist eine Welt. Fotografien. Museum Moderner Kunst Stiftung Wörlen, Passau (Germany)

Books and exhibition catalogues
Birgus, Vladimír. Jindřich Štreit: Fotografie. Bruntál, 1980.
14 regards sur le district de Saint-Quentin. 1992. .
Vesnice Je Svet / The Village Is a Global World / Das Dorf Ist Eine Globale Welt / Un village, c'est tout en monde. Arcadia, 1993. .
Der Hof: Vom Leben am Lande. . With Manfred Chobot.
Štreit, Jindřich. Japonsko: Lidé z Akagi / . Opava, Rychnov n.Kn., 1996.    Photographs of Akagi in Gunma Prefecture, Japan. With a preface by Vlasta Čiháková-Noshiro (in four languages but not German) and a biography and information about Štreit (in four languages but not Japanese).
Štreit, Jindřich; Dufek Antonín. Zabavené fotografie / The Confiscated Photographs. Brno: Moravian Gallery, 1999.  
Štreit, Jindřich; Cousin, Christophe; Wagner,  Jean-Jacques. A coeur perdu / Touches of Heart / Doteky srdce. Belfort: Musée d'art et d'histoire de Belfort, 1999.  
Štreit, Jindřich. Cesta ke svobodě / The Road Towards Freedom / Weg zur Freiheit. Bruntál: Okresní úřad, 2000.  
Štreit, Jindřich. Brána naděje / The Gate of Hope / La porte de l'espoir / Tor der Hoffnung. Olomouc: Arcibiskupství olomoucké, 2000. 
Štreit, Jindřich; Wawrzacz, Jiří (text): Lidé Třineckých železáren / People of Třinec Steelworks / Die Menschen die Třinecer Hütte / Les gens de l'usine métallurgique de Třinec. Třinec: Třinecké železárny; Moravia Steel, 2000. 
People of the Olomouc region / Lidé Olomouckého okresu. New York: Soho Photo; Czech Center New York, 2000. . 
Štreit, Jindřich. Fotóhomok / Fotografie z kraje písku / Photographs from the Flatlands. Budapest: Budapest Galéria, 2000. . 
Jindřich Štreit ze Sovince, aneb, Kam (ne)vstoupila noha fotografova. Moravský Beroun: Moravská expedice, 2001. . 
Mezi námi / Among Us. V Sovinci: Společnost přátel umění, 2001. . 
Štreit, Jindřich; Sedláček, Martin (text). Daleko od domova. Brno: Nakladatelství Jaroslav Sedláček, 2002.  
Cesty života / Ways of life. Olomouc: Krajský úřad Olomouckého kraje, 2003. . 
Spolu / Together. Olomouc: Občanské sdružení SPOLU, 2003. . 
 Jindřich Štreit - Tváře za zdí / Jindřich Štreit - Faces behind the wall / Yinderehe Shitecaide - Weicheng zhi nei. Sedliště ve Slezsku: Lašské muzeum a galerie; Prague: Čínský kulturní institut, 2003. . 
Štreit, Jindřich; Kopřiva, J.; Perunová, K. (text). Tak blízko, tak daleko. Čečna a Ingušsko 2003 / So Close and Yet So Far. Chechnya and Ingushetia 2003 / So nah und doch so fern. Tschetschenien und Ingutschien 2003. Prague: Sdružení Česká katolická charita, 2004.  
Jindřich Štreit: Fotografie 1965-2005 / Jindřich Štreit: Photographs 1965-2005. Prague: Kant, 2006. . 
Paměť času. Rýmařov: Městské muzeum v Rýmařově, 2006. . 
Identita reality. V Bruntále: Muzeum v Bruntále, 2007. . 
Ocelový svět / World of steel. Hranice: Dost, 2008. . 
Vítkovice. Prague: Kant, 2008. . 
Japonsko 1995 - Návraty. Hranice: Dost, 2008. . 
Víra a odpuštění / Faith and forgiveness. Ostrava: Petarda, 2008. . 
Europeans. Praha: Kant, 2009. .  With Vladimír Birgus and Jindřich Marco.

Notes

References

External links 

"Village is a Global World", Amber Online. Štreit's photographs taken in and around Crook, County Durham, c1993
"Jindrich Streit Black and White photography exhibition Prague 2007", ABC Prague.

Czech photographers
Living people
People from Vsetín
Photography in Japan
Recipients of Medal of Merit (Czech Republic)
1946 births
Palacký University Olomouc alumni